Balad, also transliterated Beled or Belad, is a city in Saladin Governorate, Iraq,  north of the national capital, Baghdad. It is the capital of Balad District. Located between the towns of Al Dhuluiya, Yathrib and Ishaqi, Balad's inhabitants belong to farmers work mainly in grape farms, fig trees, and citrus growers.

In the later months of 2014 the city was besieged by Islamic State of Iraq and the Levant forces, which was repelled by the Shia citizens of the city and the Iraqi Army.

During the Iraq War

During the Iraq War Balad was, in 2006, the site of sectarian violence involving Sunni and Shi'ite militias.

In 2007 the mayor, Amir Abdul Hadi, escaped an assassination attempt.

Military installations
The largest military air base in Iraq, formerly LSA Anaconda, Balad Air Base, or Al-Bakir Air Base, is located within the municipality of Yethrib near Balad. As of early 2007 the base was the central hub for airlift and US Air Force operations in Iraq; it was also a major transshipment point for US Army supply convoys.

On the outskirts of Balad proper is a tiny forward operating base called Balad Joint Coordination Center (formerly FOB Paliwoda).  Over the years, FOB Paliwoda had been occupied by 1st Battalion, 8th Infantry, 3rd Brigade Combat Team, and 3rd Squadron 4th US Cavalry in an effort to create a joint effort between coalition and local forces.

2016 attack

On the 7 July 2016, militants from the Islamic State attacked the tomb of Muhammad ibn Ali al-Hadi, the son of Ali al-Hadi and the brother of Hasan al-Askari. According to Reuters citing Iraqi security forces, "at least 20 people were killed and 50 others wounded on Thursday evening in an attack on a Shi'ite mausoleum north of Baghdad". A suicide car bomb blew up at the external gate of the mausoleum, allowing several gunmen to storm the site and start shooting at pilgrims on a visit on the occasion of the Eid al-Fitr festival.

References

External links
Iraq Image - Balad Satellite Observation
Balad from Globalsecurity.org
Biggest Base in Iraq Has Small-Town Feel
Air Force in Iraq
1st Infantry Division News
Diary of an insurgent in retreat

 
Populated places in Saladin Governorate
District capitals of Iraq
Cities in Iraq